Entemena, also called Enmetena, lived circa 2400 BC, was a son of En-anna-tum I, and he reestablished Lagash as a power in Sumer. He defeated Il, king of Umma, in a territorial conflict, through an alliance with Lugal-kinishe-dudu of Uruk, successor to Enshakushanna, who is in the king list. The tutelary deity Shul-utula was his personal deity. His reign lasted at least 19 years.

Territory
Entemena of Lagash controlled the cities of southern Mesopotamia, from Badtibira to Uruk:

Alliance treaty

The most remarkable document in which he is mentioned is a clay nail found in Girsu and commemorating the alliance which he concluded with Lugal-kinishe-dudu of Uruk, the oldest mention of a peace treaty between two kings that we know:

Territorial conflict with King Il of Umma

Entemena entered in a territorial conflict with Il, king of Umma, as mentioned in the "war inscription" on his cone in the Louvre Museum:

Il was defeated by Entemena, who had sought the aid of Lugal-kinishe-dudu of Uruk, successor to Enshakushanna, who is in the king list.

War inscription by Entemena of Lagaš

Foundation cone of Entemena
A foundation cone of Entemena, in excellent condition relates the beginning of a war between the city-states of Lagaš and Umma during the Early Dynastic III period, one of the earliest border conflicts recorded. (RIME 1.09.05.01). This text was inscribed on a small clay cone c. 2400 BC (Louvre Museum, reference AO 3004). The first row of cuneiform characters reads:

Net cylinder of Entemena

The "Net cylinder" of Entemena is a cylinder of a peculiar design, with a net pattern on the bottom, which is the second known cylinder describing the border conflict between Lagash and Umma. The content is identical to the cone cylinder. It is located in the Yale Babylonian Collection.

Statue of Entemena

Entemena has one of the earliest statues of a known king from Mesopotamia. It is made of diorite, and is 76 centimeters tall. Entemena, although ruler of the city-state of Lagash, wears the typical dress of a devotee: a kaunakes fleeced skirt with a tassel in the back. He is clasping his hands at the chest, in a typical pose of perpetual attendance before the deity.

The statue of Entemena reflects a style of which a few other examples are known from Mesopotamia, such as the statue of Ikun-Shamash from Mari, the statue of Enzi from Der, or the statue of Lugal-dalu, which still has its head intact.

The statue of Entemena has a very long cuneiform inscription on the side (right arm) and on the back. It includes the names and titles of Entemena, and the mention "Enlil (the supreme Sumerian god) loves Entemena".

The statue was housed in the National Museum of Iraq. In May 2003 the statue was stolen during the 2003 invasion of Iraq. It was found in New York and returned in 2010.

Silver vase of Entemena

A tripod of silver dedicated by Entemena to his god is now in the Louvre. A frieze of lions devouring ibexes and deer, incised with great artistic skill, runs round the neck, while the eagle crest of Lagash adorns the globular part. The vase is a proof of the high degree of excellence to which the goldsmith's art had already attained. A vase of calcite, also dedicated by Entemena, has been found at Nippur. The inscription of the neck of the silver vase reads:

Foundation tablets

Several votive tablets in the name of Entemena are known. They usually records Entemena's name, title and filiation, and his accomplishment in establishing temples or devotional images. The tablets are often associated with a "foundation nail", called temen ("foundation") in Sumerian, which was inserted into the ground under the foundation of temples, together with the inscribed tablets and offerings such as jewelry or small statuettes of protective divinities.

Perforated plate of Dudu

Another artifact related to Entemena is a votive plaque beating the name of Dudu, priest of Lagash for Ningirsu in Entemena's time. Dudu is known as priest of Lagash under Entemena from the last line of the inscription on the silver vase of Entemena. The plate was made out of bitumen, a rather distinctive feature, as most such plaques were made of limestone or gypsum. The plaque depicts various scenes: a standing man in a kaunakes holding a walking stick, a resting cow, and the symbol of Lagash: an eagle holding two lions, although the lions are uncharacteristically biting back at the wings of the eagle. A symbolic wave pattern at the bottom of the plate is thought to symbolize the flow of water.

It is inscribed with the following text: "For Ningirsu of the Eninnu, Dudu, priest of Ningirsu ... brought [this material] and fashioned it as a mace stand." The exact function of the plaque is unknown: it has been interpreted as a mace-holder, a plaque to be nailed into the wall of a temple, or a door panel.

Other artifacts 
Door sockets in the name of Entemena, or the plaque of the priest Dudu, associated with Entemena in another inscription, are among the other famous artifacts related to Entemena.

References 

Kings of Lagash
25th-century BC Sumerian kings